"Funny" is a song by British record production duo Chase & Status, featuring vocals from Frisco. The song was released as a digital download on 6 November 2015 through MTA Records and Mercury Records. The song peaked at number 96 on the UK Singles Chart. The song is the first of four in their London Bars project, a series of singles released in collaboration with grime MCs throughout November 2015.

Music video
A music video to accompany the release of "Funny" was first released onto YouTube on 5 November 2015 at a total length of four minutes and eleven seconds.

Track listing

Chart performance

Weekly charts

Release history

References

2015 singles
2015 songs
Chase & Status songs
Songs written by Saul Milton
Songs written by Will Kennard
Mercury Records singles